The Lords of Atripalda were titled signore (lord) and conte (count).

List

References

Province of Avellino
Altripalda